The J. League All-Star Soccer, called JOMO All-Star Soccer for sponsorship reasons, is an annual exhibition match organised by the Japan Football Association and J. League. It has been played each year since the inception of J. League in 1993. The players are chosen by the fan voting and the recommendation from J. League. The manager and coaches are also selected by the fan voting.

The old Japan Soccer League had an all-star game that was the forerunner to this competition. From 1966 to 1972 it was a two-leg final and from 1979 to 1992 a one-game affair, all pitting a West team against an East team. The last two games, in 1991 and 1992, were of the few football matches that took place at the baseball-specific Tokyo Dome.

The competition is officially titled with its sponsor's name. It was called Kodak All-Star Soccer between 1993–1998 as Kodak Japan (the Japanese subsidiary of Eastman Kodak) sponsored it. It was known as Tarami All-Star Soccer from 1999 to 2001 after food company Tarami. It has been titled as JOMO All-Star Soccer since 2002 because Japan Energy Corporation whose filling stations are branded as JOMO sponsor the competition.

Team selection
 All the J. League Division 1 clubs are divided into two teams, J-West and J-East, based on the geographical location of the club's hometown. Because both team should have the same number of clubs, some clubs based in central Japan have been allotted to both teams in the past due to the promotion or relegation of other clubs. The 1995 and 1996 competitions were exceptions, where the clubs were divided based on the result of the previous season. Those finished at an even number of the standing were allotted to J-Altair, and those finished at an odd number to J-Vega (Note: In the Tanabata folk tale, anthropomorphic Vega and Altair are said to see each other once a year across the Milky Way for a romantic reason).
 Each team consists of 16 players as well as 1 manager and 2 coaches. 11 players (1 GK, 3 DFs, 3MFs and 3FWs as well as the most voted 4th-ranked field player) are selected by the fan voting. More than 4 players cannot be selected from any one club. 5 other players are additionally selected by the recommendation from J. League that makes sure that each club has at least one representative in the competition. The fan voting also chooses 1 manager and 2 coaches. The most voted club manager acts as the manager and the 2nd and 3rd most voted club managers serve as coaches.

Results

JOMO Cup J. League Dream Match
J. League All-Star Soccer should not be confused with another exhibition match JOMO Cup J. League Dream Match. The latter was held once a year between 1995 and 2001 and was competed between Japanese J. League players (in the case of the 1997 and 2000 competitions, the Japan National Team) and non-Japanese J. League players.

Results

Event Match
2011 Tōhoku earthquake Charity Match

See also 
JOMO Cup
K League All-Star Game

External links
 (Japanese) Official Web site
 (Japanese) 2004 JOMO All-Star Match official website
 (Japanese) 2005 JOMO All-Star Match official website
 (Japanese) 2006 JOMO All-Star Match official website
 (Japanese) 2007 JOMO All-Star Match official website

J.League
All-star games
Representative teams of association football leagues